The Roaring River is a right tributary of the Swan River in Manitoba, Canada.

Geography

Manitoba's Duck Mountain is part of the Manitoba Escarpment.
The mountain is forest-covered, and contains many lakes and streams.
The Roaring River drains the north side of the Duck Mountain Provincial Park of Manitoba. 
It receives the Favel River on its right. 
It runs northeast until it joins the Swan River from the south. 
The Swan River continues northeast and discharges into the Swan Lake.

A site along the river has been analyzed for pollen records of the Middle Pleistocene,  thousand years ago. It shows a sequence from a cool climate with boreal forest, to a warm climate with grassland and then oak savanna, and then a return to boreal forest.

Hydrology

Most of the flow (about 60%) occurs during the spring run-off from April to May, as the snow in the watershed melts.
The flow tapers off during the summer and fall.

History

Settlement of the region began in 1899 with the completion of the Canadian National Railway to Swan River.
The Roaring River School District was organized in October 1902. 
Until 1951 children were taught in a wood-frame school building in the west of the Rural Municipality of Minitonas.
In 1911 Gertrude Twilley (later Gertrude Richardson by marriage) and her mother moved from England to Canada to stay with Gertrude's brother Fred on his homestead in the Roaring River district of Manitoba. The Roaring River Suffrage Association was founded in March 1912, with both men and women as members. 
Getrude Twilley was president and her sister Fannie Livesey was secretary. They were one of the first suffrage groups in Manitoba.

References

Sources

Rivers of Manitoba